Ferdinand III (Ferdinand Ernest; 13 July 1608, in Graz – 2 April 1657, in Vienna) was from 1621 Archduke of Austria, King of Hungary from 1625, King of Croatia and Bohemia from 1627 and Holy Roman Emperor from 1637 until his death in 1657.

Ferdinand ascended the throne at the beginning of the last decade of the Thirty Years' War and introduced lenient policies to depart from old ideas of divine rights under his father, as he had wished to end the war quickly. As the numerous battles had not resulted in sufficient military containment of the Protestant enemies, and he was confronted with a decay of Imperial power, Ferdinand was compelled to abandon the political stances of his Habsburg predecessors in many respects in order to open the long road towards the much-delayed peace treaty. Although his authority among the princes was weakened after the war, in Bohemia, Hungary and the Austria, Ferdinand's position as sovereign was uncontested.

Ferdinand was the first Habsburg monarch to be recognised as a musical composer.

Biography

Early life

Ferdinand was born in Graz as third son of Emperor Ferdinand II of Habsburg and his first wife, Maria Anna of Bavaria, and was baptised as Ferdinand Ernst. He grew up in Carinthia with loving care from his parents and he developed great affection for his siblings and his father, with whom he always found a consensus in future disagreements. At his father's court he received religious and scholarly training from Jesuits. The Maltese knights Johann Jacob von Dhaun (member of the Lower Austrian estate, a union of the local nobility) and Christoph Simon von Thun (head of Ferdinand's Imperial court and household) had greatly influenced the education of the young archduke. Simon von Thun instructed Ferdinand in military matters. Ferdinand is said to have spoken several languages, although how many and to what degree is unclear. After the deaths of his brothers Karl (1603) and Johann Karl (1619), he was designated as his father's successor and systematically prepared to take over the reign. Like his father, he was a devout Catholic, yet he had a certain aversion to the influence of the Jesuits who had ruled his father's court.

Ferdinand became Archduke of Austria in 1621. On 8 December 1625 he was crowned King of Hungary, on 27 November 1627 King of Bohemia. Ferdinand enhanced his authority and set an important legal and military precedent by issuing a Revised Land Ordinance that deprived the Bohemian estates of their right to raise soldiers, reserving this power solely for the monarch. His father was unable to secure him the election as Roman king at the Regensburg diet of 1630. After he had unsuccessfully applied for the supreme command of the Imperial army and participation in campaigns of Wallenstein, he joined Wallenstein's opponents at the Imperial court in Vienna and was involved in the arrangements on his second deposition in the beginning of 1634.

He married the Spanish Infanta, his cousin Maria Anna of Spain, after years of negotiations with Spanish relatives in 1631. Although in the middle of the war, this elaborate wedding was celebrated over a period of fourteen months. The marriage produced six children, including his successors, Ferdinand IV of Hungary and Emperor Leopold I. His loving and intelligent wife and her brother, the Spanish Cardinal Infant Ferdinand, had great influence on Ferdinand and formed the most important link between the Habsburg courts in Madrid, Brussels and Vienna in the difficult period of the war for Habsburg following the death of Wallenstein.

Commander in chief
After Wallenstein's assassination, Ferdinand III personally took command over the Imperial army on 2 May 1634, supported by the generals Gallas and Piccolomini, the military adviser Johann Kaspar von Stadion and the political adviser Obersthofmeister (Lord Chamberlain) Maximilian von und zu Trauttmansdorff. He achieved his first major military successes in July 1634 by regaining the city of Regensburg, which had been captured and occupied by the Swedes in November 1633. In August 1634, the city of Donauwörth was recaptured, which had been occupied by Sweden since April 1632. In September 1634 these successes were surpassed by the decisive victory in the Battle of Nördlingen, a joint effort with the help of the Spanish forces under Cardinal Infante Ferdinand.

As a consequence, the Swedes lost control over Southern Germany and retreated to the North. Ferdinand gained wider political influence, even if his personal contribution in Nördlingen was rather limited. His influence increased further after the fall of the powerful Imperial minister Hans Ulrich von Eggenberg, who had domineered the politics of Ferdinand II. In 1635 Ferdinand worked as Imperial commissioner in the negotiations for the Peace of Prague, as he tried to persuade the prince electors to adopt the idea of concerted warfare. He also advocated the inclusion of the still reluctant Protestant estates into the peace process. Even after the resignation of the supreme command, Ferdinand continued to occupy himself with theoretical military issues. Raimondo Montecuccoli later dedicated one of his works to him.

Sovereign rule

Wartime reign

Ferdinand III was elected King of the Romans at the Diet of Regensburg on 22 December, 1636. Upon the death of his father on 15 February 1637, Ferdinand became Emperor. His political adviser Trauttmansdorff advanced to the position of Prime Minister of Austria and Chief diplomat, but was replaced by Johann Ludwig von Nassau-Hadamar in 1647 as his health had begun to deteriorate. Trauttmansdorff was succeeded as Obersthofmeister by the later Prime Minister Johann Weikhard of Auersperg who also taught the royal heir Ferdinand IV. Unlike his father, Ferdinand III employed no spiritual counsellor.

By the time Ferdinand became Emperor, vast sections of the imperial territories had been absolutely devastated by two decades of war. The population was completely exhausted and massively diminished, countless people were impoverished, disabled, sick, homeless, many had lost their families and had abandoned all moral standards. Ferdinand did not endeavour to continue the war. But the momentum of the war, the political circumstances and his reluctance to act prevented a quick end to the war. Any hope to make early peace with France and Sweden did not materialize.

With the intervention of France in 1635, the war flared up again. After initial success and a combined Spanish-Imperial campaign into the heart of France in 1636, the military situation of the Emperor strongly deteriorated. The Swedes regained initiative with victory at Wittstock in 1636 and threatened his recently gained allies Brandenburg and Saxony. Ferdinand reacted with redirecting his main army under Gallas from France to northern Germany in 1637. Gallas could contain the Swedes in Pomerania until severe lack of supplies forced him to retreat back to Bohemia in late 1638. At the same time, Bernhard of Saxe-Weimar, a German protestant in French service, took the Habsburg possessions in Alsace and the stronghold of Breisach after a long siege. To check the advance of the Swedish general Banér, who invaded Bohemia via Saxony in 1639, Ferdinand had to recall Piccolomini's army from the Spanish Netherlands, thereby largely ending direct military cooperation with Spain. Although Piccolomini and the Emperor's brother Archduke Leopold Wilhelm as new Imperial commander could repel Banér back to the Weser river in 1640, the Bohemian lands underwent continuous threat from now on and the Emperor permanently lost control over northern Germany.

An Imperial Diet was arranged for 1641 in Regensburg, where the estates discussed possible peace arrangements. It turned out to be problematic that the Emperor had excluded princes, who had previously been on the opposing side, as well as the Protestant administrators of various princes of the Imperial Diet. After all, it finally succeeded in agreeing all imperial estates with the exception of the Electoral Palatinate, the Duchy of Brunswick-Lüneburg and Hesse-Kassel to the resolutions of the Diet. In 1641, a preliminary peace was signed in Hamburg between Ferdinand, Spain, France and Sweden and a final peace congress was to convene in Osnabrück and Münster. An alliance between Sweden and France was fully effective since 1642. The Swedes won the Battle of Breitenfeld in 1642. One year later, France decisively defeated Spain at Rocroi, allowing them to dedicate more troops to the German theatre.

Peace negotiations

Negotiations for a peace agreement began in 1644 in Münster and Osnabrück and lasted until 1648 while warfare continued.

The negotiations in Westphalia turned out to be difficult, beginning with a dispute over the rules of procedure. The emperor had to give in to pressure from France and Sweden and admit all imperial estates to the congress and receive the ius belli ac pacis. In addition to peace between the parties involved, the internal constitution of the empire was also newly regulated. The Imperial Court received weekly reports on the negotiations. Even though the reports had been produced by officials, the process also proved to be an extremely busy time for the emperor, as despite all the advisers, he had to make the decisions. The study of the documents suggests, that Ferdinand was a monarch with expertise with a sense of responsibility and the willingness to make difficult decisions. In the course of the negotiations, Ferdinand had to  reconsider his original goals according to the deteriorating military situation. His advisor Maximilian von und zu Trauttmansdorff suggested a great battle to end the war favourably.

The emperor personally took part in the campaign against the Swedes, that ended with a defeat at the Battle of Jankau on 6 March, 1645. The Swedish army under Lennart Torstensson then advanced to Vienna. To raise morale in the city, the emperor circled the city in a large procession with an image of the Virgin Mary. As the Swedish army drew closer, Ferdinand left the city. Archduke Leopold Wilhelm managed to drive off the opponents. At times Ferdinand managed to get Prince George I Rákóczi of Transylvania, an ally of France and Sweden, on his side. In the 1645 Peace of Linz the Emperor had to guarantee the Hungarian estates the right of imperial representation and freedom of religion for the Protestants, which prevented the Counter-reformation and future Absolutist rule in Hungary.

The Habsburgs could no longer win the war without the support of the Spanish allies. Due to domestic difficulties, financial and military Spanish support for Ferdinand was completely stopped in 1645. Without foreign military funds, the imperial troops were incapable of offensive operations, which weakened Ferdinand's position in negotiations. The emperor reissued the instructions for the peace talks for Trautmannsdorf, who left for Westphalia as chief negotiator. These documents were kept strictly secret and were only published in 1962. Reviews revealed, that Ferdinand surrendered numerous previous claims and was ready for greater concessions than were ultimately necessary.

Results of the war
The empire suffered considerable territorial losses. The Three Bishoprics, effectively under French control since 1552, were officially ceded to France. The Netherlands and Switzerland gained complete independence. Within the Empire, Sweden received Rügen and Western Pomerania as well as the bishoprics of Bremen-Verden and the city of Wismar as Imperial fiefs. The Tyrolean cadet line of the Habsburgs lost the Sundgau and Breisach at the Upper Rhine to France as well as supremacy over the Décapole. Further transfers of property took place in various regions of the empire. Bavaria retained its electoral dignity it had won at the beginning of the war, a further - eighth - electoral estate was created in the Palatinate.

The implementation of the Counter-Reformation in the core countries of Ferdinand was sanctioned. Only in some parts of Silesia were certain concessions made to the Protestants. From now on, the institutions of the empire should be equally occupied by Catholics and Protestants. The imperial estates were able to enforce considerable rights. This included the right to form alliances with foreign powers, even if they were not allowed to be directed against the emperor and the empire. The largest territories benefited most from these regulations. Ferdinand's attempt to absolutist rule of the Reich failed, although the empire and the imperial office remained significant.

The emperor considered the peace agreement to be no catastrophic defeat and thanks to Trautmannsdorff's negotiating skills worse could be prevented. As a matter of fact the consequences for the Austrian hereditary countries were comparatively favorable. So the expropriations in Bohemia and the Verneuerte Landesordnung (Renewed Regional Order) of 1627 remained untouched. Upper Austria, formerly pledged to Bavaria, stayed under Habsburg house rule without paying a refund.

Despite many losses, the constitutional position of the emperor after the Peace of Westphalia permitted an active imperial policy in cooperation with parts of the estates. In the Habsburg monarchy the prerequisites for the development of a uniform absolutist state remained intact. Thus, imperial policies of the peace negotiations succeeded in this respect - despite the failure to meet some of the original negotiation goals.

After the war

At the Nuremberg Peace congress of 1649/1650, the final withdrawal of foreign troops and the political settlement of the relationship with Sweden and France were carried out during which hostilities nearly started again.

The Empress Maria Anna of Spain had died giving birth to her last child on 13 May, 1646. Ferdinand remarried to another first cousin, Maria Leopoldine of Austria (1632-1649) on 2 July 1648. The wedding ceremony, held in Linz, was notably splendid. This marriage however lasted little more than a year, ending with Maria Leopoldine's own premature death in childbirth.

Ferdinand's last marriage was to Eleonora Magdalena Gonzaga of Mantua-Nevers in 1651. Empress Eleonora was very pious and donated, among other things, for the Ursuline monastery in Vienna and the Order of the Starry Cross for noble women. She was also well educated and interested in art. She also composed music and wrote poetry and together with Ferdinand was the centre of the Italian academy.

Ferdinand's sovereign power in the Austrian hereditary lands, as well his royal power in Hungary and Bohemia was significantly greater than that of his predecessor before 1618. Princely power was strengthened, while the influence of the estates was massively reduced. The church reform towards the Counter-reformation continued. Ferdinand was able to form a standing army from the remains of the imperial army, that was soon to show great effectiveness under Ferdinand's successor Leopold I. Under Ferdinand the fortifications of Vienna were massively expanded and updated as the emperor invested a total sum of over 80,000 fl.

Despite a considerable loss of authority in the empire, Ferdinand remained active in imperial politics. He would also re-establish his positions in the empire's institutions. Ferdinand had the Aulic Council restructured, which competed with the Imperial Chamber Court and had already been recognized in the Peace of Westphalia. It remained in effect until 1806. In late 1652 he summoned a Reichstag in Regensburg, which lasted until 1654. The event was the last traditional imperial diet and was replaced by the future Perpetual Reichstag with its permanent congress of emissaries. The Reichstag decided that the content of the peace treaties in Münster and Osnabrück under Reich law should become part of the Reich constitution.

The emperor managed to postpone some of the constitutional questions that were particularly dangerous for his power. The fact that some of the nobles raised by his father to the rank of prince gained a seat and vote in the Reichstag also speaks for his growing strength. At this Reichstag he also made an alliance with Poland against Sweden. The empire came to Poland's support during the Second Northern War. Ferdinand also brought about the royal election of his son Ferdinand IV, who, however died in 1654. Because his second son Leopold was still too young to be elected as King of the Romans, Ferdinand delayed the opening as well as the conclusion of the Deputationstag following the Reichstag to gain time until the next election. After all, Leopold was crowned King of Hungary and Bohemia. In 1656, Ferdinand sent an army into Italy to assist Spain in her struggle with France.

Death and burial place

Ferdinand died on 2 April 1657, and rests in the Capuchin Crypt in Vienna. His interior organs were separately buried in the Ducal Crypt.

Marriages and children

On 20 February 1631, Ferdinand III married his first wife, Maria Anna of Spain (1606–1646). She was the youngest daughter of Philip III of Spain and Margaret of Austria. They were first cousins, as Maria Anna's mother was a sister of Ferdinand's father. They were parents to six children:
 Ferdinand IV, King of the Romans (8 September 1633 9 July 1654)
 Archduchess Maria Anna "Mariana" of Austria (22 December 1634 16 May 1696). At the age of 14, she was married to her maternal uncle Philip IV of Spain. Their daughter Margaret Theresa of Spain married Mariana's brother Leopold I, Holy Roman Emperor.
 Archduke Philip August of Austria (15 July 1637 22 June 1639)
 Archduke Maximilian Thomas of Austria (21 December 1638 29 June 1639)
 Leopold I, Holy Roman Emperor (9 June 1640 5 May 1705)
 Archduchess Maria of Austria (13 May 1646)

On 2 July 1648 in Linz, Ferdinand III married his second wife, Archduchess Maria Leopoldine of Austria (1632–1649). She was a daughter of Leopold V, Archduke of Austria, and Claudia de' Medici. They were first cousins as male-line grandchildren of Charles II, Archduke of Austria, and Maria Anna of Bavaria. They had a single son:
 Archduke Karl Josef of Austria (7 August 1649 27 January 1664). He was Grand Master of the Teutonic Knights from 1662 to his death.

On 30 April 1651, Ferdinand III married Eleonora Gonzaga. She was a daughter of Charles IV Gonzaga, Duke of Rethel. They were parents to four children:
 Archduchess Theresia Maria Josefa of Austria (27 March 1652 26 July 1653)
 Archduchess Eleonora Maria of Austria (21 May 1653 17 December 1697); married first Michael Korybut Wiśniowiecki, King of Poland, and then Charles Léopold, Duke of Lorraine.
 Archduchess Maria Anna Josepha of Austria (30 December 1654 4 April 1689); married Johann Wilhelm, Elector Palatine.
 Archduke Ferdinand Josef Alois of Austria (11 February 1657 16 June 1658)

Music
Ferdinand III was a well-known patron of music and a composer. He studied music under Giovanni Valentini, who bequeathed his musical works to him, and had close ties with Johann Jakob Froberger, one of the most important keyboard composers of the 17th century. Froberger lamented the emperor's death and dedicated to him one of his most celebrated works, Lamentation faite sur la mort très douloureuse de Sa Majesté Impériale, Ferdinand le troisième; a tombeau for Ferdinand III's death was composed by the renowned violinist Johann Heinrich Schmelzer. Some of Ferdinand's own compositions survive in manuscripts: masses, motets, hymns and other sacred music, as well as a few secular pieces. His Drama musicum was praised by Athanasius Kircher, and the extant works, although clearly influenced by Valentini, show a composer with an individual style and a solid technique.

Recordings of Ferdinand's compositions include:
Jesu Redemptor Omnium. Deus Tuorum. Humanae Salutis. With Schmelzer: Lamento Sopra La Morte de Ferdinand III. Joseph I: Regina Coeli. Leopold I: Sonata Piena; Laudate Pueri. Wiener Akademie, dir. Martin Haselböck, CPO 1997.
Ferdinand III: Hymnus "Jesu Corona Virginum". On Musik für Gamben-Consort. Klaus Mertens, Hamburger Ratsmusik, dir. Simone Eckert CPO 2010

Ancestry

See also
 Kings of Germany family tree. He was related to every other king of Germany.

Notes

References

External links

Regnal titles
Editing Ferdinand III, by the grace of God elected Holy Roman Emperor, forever August, King in Germany, King of Hungary, Bohemia, Dalmatia, Croatia, Slavonia, Rama, Serbia, Galicia, Lodomeria, Cumania, Bulgaria, Archduke of Austria, Duke of Burgundy, Brabant, Styria, Carinthia, Carniola, Margrave of Moravia, Duke of Luxemburg, of the Higher and Lower Silesia, of Württemberg and Teck, Prince of Swabia, Count of Habsburg, Tyrol, Kyburg and Goritia, Marquess of the Holy Roman Empire, Burgovia, the Higher and Lower Lusace, Lord of the Marquisate of Slavonia, of Port Naon and Salines, etc. etc.

See also

|-

|-

1608 births
1657 deaths
17th-century Holy Roman Emperors
17th-century archdukes of Austria
Austrian Baroque composers
Dukes of Teschen
Knights of the Golden Fleece
Male classical composers
Military personnel from Graz
17th-century classical composers
Austrian people of the Thirty Years' War
Field marshals of the Holy Roman Empire
Dukes of Carniola
Burials at the Imperial Crypt
Burials at St. Stephen's Cathedral, Vienna
Royal reburials
 
Austrian patrons of music